Sir Hubert Bennett, FRIBA (4 September 1909 – 13 December 2000) was a British architect. He was Architect to the Greater London Council (formerly the London County Council) and Superintending Architect of Metropolitan Buildings from 1956 to 1971, succeeding Sir Leslie Martin. 

In that role, he oversaw many controversial post-war housing projects in London. He was knighted in 1970.

Work 

 Hammersmith flyover, West London (1961)
 Draper House, Elephant and Castle, London (1965)
 (with Jack Whittle) Queen Elizabeth Hall and Purcell Room, London (1967)
 (with Jack Whittle) Hayward Gallery, London (1968)
 (with François Druet) Palais des Festivals et des Congrès, Cannes, France (1982)
 Altar of Tuxlith Chapel, Milland, West Sussex (1990s)

References

Sources
 "Sir Hubert Bennett" obituary, The Times, 15 December 2020.
Profile, ukwhoswho.com. Accessed 24 January 2023.

Knights Bachelor
Fellows of the Royal Institute of British Architects
20th-century English architects
Alumni of the Manchester School of Architecture
1909 births

2000 deaths